Nordheim vor der Rhön is a municipality  in the district of Rhön-Grabfeld in Bavaria in Germany.  It is located in the upper Streu valley, between Ostheim and Fladungen.

References

Rhön-Grabfeld
Rhön Mountains